Tonmoy (known as Master Tonmoy) is a Bangladeshi film actor. He won Bangladesh National Film Award for Best Child Artist for the film Anya Jibon (1995).

Selected films
 Keyamot Theke Keyamot - 1993
 Anya Jibon - 1995
 Nayan - 1995
 Hangor Nodi Grenade - 1997

Awards and nominations
National Film Awards

References

External links

Bangladeshi film actors
Best Child Artist National Film Award (Bangladesh) winners
Living people
Year of birth missing (living people)